The Local Government (Wales) Act 1994 (c. 19) is an Act of the Parliament of the United Kingdom which amended the Local Government Act 1972 to create the current local government structure in Wales of 22 unitary authority areas, referred to as principal areas in the Act, and abolished the previous two-tier structure of counties and districts. It came into effect on 1 April 1996.

Background
In June 1991, the Secretary of State for Wales, David Hunt, published a consultation paper on reform of local government in Wales. The paper proposed the replacing of the existing two-tier system of administrative counties and districts, established by the Local Government Act 1972 in 1974, with unitary authorities. The number and size of the unitary areas was not set down, instead three options were given for ten, twenty or twenty-four new councils.
On 3 March 1992 the Secretary of State made a statement in the House of Commons, in which he stated that the number of proposed unitary authorities was to be twenty-three. He further stated:

The areas of the new councils were not precisely defined, although a map was issued at the time of the statement.

The Conservatives held power at the general election held on 9 April 1992, and a white paper Local government in Wales: A Charter for the Future was published on St David's Day, 1 March 1993. The number of unitary authorities had been reduced to twenty-one, with the deletion of separate authorities for Merionethshire and Montgomeryshire, and their areas and proposed names were given. speaking in the commons, David Hunt said:

The fire service, previously administered by county councils, was to be organised as three combined authorities. Elections for the new councils was to be in 1994, initially acting as "shadow authorities" until 1 April 1995 when they would assume their responsibilities.

In May 1993, a cabinet reshuffle led to John Redwood replacing David Hunt as Welsh Secretary. In November 1993, the reorganisation was put back by a year to 1 April 1996 to allow more time for consultation. The Glamorgan Valleys authority was to be renamed as Rhondda Cynon Taff, and a number of boundary changes were made. Following representations, the Heads of Valleys area was split into Merthyr Tydfil and Blaenau Gwent, each approximating to an existing district increasing the number of unitary authorities to twenty-two:

The Local Government (Wales) Bill was introduced to the Commons in June 1994. The debate on the bill led to a number of opposition amendments which sought to increase the number of councils, with representations being made by Members of Parliament for the affected areas. None of these amendments was successful and the Bill was passed by both houses and received the Royal Assent on 5 July 1994.

The Act
The Act established, from 1 April 1996, twenty-two new unitary authority areas, to be known as 'counties' or 'county boroughs', and abolished the eight local government counties and 37 districts that had been formed in 1974. "Preserved counties", based on the previous local government counties as established in 1974, were created for the purposes of lieutenancy and shrievality.

The Act also gives the legal definition of the territory of Wales was defined by the combined area of Welsh counties under section 20 of Local Government Act 1972. The counties were reorganised by the Local Government (Wales) Act 1994 but the territorial definition of Wales remained unchanged.

Each new unitary authority area was to have an elected council and be divided into electoral districts, each returning one councillor. The entire council of each area was to be elected every four years, with the first election in 1995.

Section 245 of the Local Government Act 1972 allowed local government districts to petition the Privy Council in order acquire borough status. As the 1994 Act abolished the districts in Wales it inserted a section 245A in the 1972 Act to allow the new unitary authority areas which did not have the status of a borough to acquire it. As the only unitary authority areas that are not already styled as 'boroughs' are styled as 'counties', this leads to the curious provision that a council can petition for its county to become a county borough.

The Secretary of State was empowered to direct a council to make a decentralisation scheme, with area committees being formed of all the councillors for a specified area. This provision has been used to create, for example, area committees for Brecknockshire, Montgomeryshire and Radnorshire in Powys, and the Arfon, Dwyfor and Meirionnydd in Gwynedd.

Schedule 1 listed the new counties and county boroughs:

Counties

Caernarfonshire and Merionethshire was subsequently renamed as Gwynedd and Cardiganshire was renamed Ceredigion by their respective councils.

County Boroughs

Aberconwy and Colwyn was subsequently renamed Conwy and Neath and Port Talbot was renamed as Neath Port Talbot by their respective councils.

See also
Subdivisions of Wales

References

External links
Full text available at OPSI Web site

United Kingdom Acts of Parliament 1994
Local government in Wales
Local government legislation in England and Wales
1994 in Wales
Acts of the Parliament of the United Kingdom concerning Wales